Al-Kiswah  (  also spelled Kissoué/Kiswe) is a city in the Rif Dimashq Governorate, Syria. It was the location of the 1303 Battle of Marj al-Saffar, and the childhood home of Adnan Awad.

Administratively, Al-Kiswah belongs to Markaz Rif Dimashq district. It is one of the largest towns of the district by terms of population.

History
The name "al-Kiswah" means “the garment”. According to a tradition related by Yaqut al-Hamawi, this is because the king of Rum sent some messengers to demand tribute from a figure named King Ghassan; he had the messengers killed and then, at the site of al-Kiswah, he had their garments divided up.

Yaqut and Ibn Battuta both described al-Kiswah as the first stage on the hajj route out of Damascus. Abu'l-Fida similarly described al-Kiswah as a stopping place on the road south of Damascus and added that between the two places, the road went through a “beautiful pass” called the 'Aqabah ash-Shuhūrah. He also wrote that it lay on a stream called the Nahr al-A'waj which flowed down from the “mountain of snow”, i.e. Mount Hermon.

In 1838, Eli Smith noted it as a predominantly Sunni Muslim village.

References

Bibliography

External links
 More information for Kiswe city
 Main site for the city

Cities in Syria
Populated places in Markaz Rif Dimashq District